The province of Astarabad (also called Gorgan and Jorjan) was a southeastern province of Safavid Iran, located on the southeastern side of the Caspian Sea. It bordered the Atrek River in the north, the Alborz in the south, the Mazandaran province to the west, and Jajarm to the east. The province was under Safavid control from 1510.

By the end of the Safavid era, Astarabad was composed of the following administrative jurisdictions: Gira'i, Goklan, Hajjilar, Jalayer, K.ra-chupi, and Yamut. Each district name was derived from the Turkoman tribe that been enstrusted with it. Some of the Turkoman tribes (such as the Qepchaq) lived to the north of Astarabad, but were still nominal subjects of the Safavids.

From 1589 to 1598, the Sa'en-khanis of the Yakka Turkoman tribe assumed control over the province as caretaker governors, due to its lack of efficient Safavid rule. Their hold over the province was ended when Shah Abbas I marched to Astarabad and pacified the tribes. In order to develop the province and levy taxes, the Safavids continued to attract Turkoman tribes to the province. The authority of the Safavid governor of Astabarad sometimes extended over the province, such as in Damghan and Bastam.

References

Sources

Further reading 
 

Astarabad
16th century in Iran
17th century in Iran
18th century in Iran
Astarabad
History of Golestan Province